The Burundi women's national rugby union team are a national sporting side of the Burundi, representing them at rugby union. The side first played a 10-a-side international in 2012. They have yet to play a full test match

History

Results

Other internationals

See also
 Rugby union in Burundi

Notes

External links

African national women's rugby union teams
Rugby union in Burundi
National sports teams of Burundi